Teddy Powell (March 1, 1905 – November 17, 1993) was born in Oakland, California, United States, as Teodoro Paolella, and became a respected American jazz musician, band leader, composer, and arranger. Some of his compositions were written under the pseudonym Freddy James.

Powell began playing violin when he was eight and picked up the banjo when he was fourteen. During the late 1920s to the early 1930s, he was a member of the Abe Lyman orchestra, taking on the additional tasks of gathering radio bands. He formed the Teddy Powell Orchestra in 1939 and it performed through the 1940s. Powell's sidemen included Tony Aless, Gus Bivona, Pete Candoli, Irving Fazola, and Charlie Ventura, but his best sideman left for better paying work.

"Snake Charmer", a song Powell published in 1937 (lyrics by Leonard Whitcup), is still a popular song among partner dancers in Finland, where it is usually performed as a translation:  Kuningaskobra fi). It placed 69th on the 1952-1959 charts, and is still being recorded by modern performers, as listed in the recordings database of the Finnish national broadcasting company Yle.

After the band folded, Powell wrote music and arrangements. He had hits with "Bewildered" and "If My Heart Could Only Talk". During the latter part of his career, he worked in music publishing.

References

External links
  as Teddy Powell
  as Freddy James
 

1905 births
1993 deaths
American jazz bandleaders
American jazz composers
American male jazz composers
American jazz guitarists
Big band bandleaders
Musicians from Oakland, California
American people of Italian descent
20th-century American composers
20th-century American guitarists
Guitarists from California
Jazz musicians from California
American male guitarists
20th-century American male musicians
20th-century jazz composers